The House of Lionidze or Leonidze (ლეონიძე) is a Georgian noble family, which also later became part of the Russian nobility.

History 
The family originated from the province of Kakheti and were elevated to the princely rank by King Heraclius II of Georgia in the mid-18th century. They were confirmed as the princes Lionidaev in Imperial Russia according to the decrees of 1825 and 1850.

Notable members 
Giorgi Leonidze (1899-1966), Georgian poet and literary scholar

References 

Noble families of Georgia (country)
Russian noble families
Georgian-language surnames